Alcalde may have one of the following meanings.
Alcalde, the Spanish title of the chief administrator of a town
Alcalde-Presidente, a mayor with attributions of a higher level
 Alcalde, New Mexico
The Alcalde, a magazine
Alcalde and Fay, an American lobbying firm
Manuel Alcalde (1956-2004), Spanish race walker